John A. Young (born 1932) is an American business manager. 

John A. Young may also refer to:

John Andrew Young (1916–2002), American politician from Texas
John Allan Young (1895–1961), Canadian politician
John Young (York County, New Brunswick politician) (1854–1934)